Periyanagalur is a village in the Ariyalur taluk of Ariyalur district, Tamil Nadu, India.

Demographics 

 census, Periyanagalur had a total population of 3173 with 1579 males and 1594 females.

References 

Villages in Ariyalur district